Montée d'Hauteville (1639 m.) is a mountain climb that was used in the 2007 Tour de France. The race caravan covered the first 15.3 km of the climb from Bourg-Saint-Maurice to the Little St Bernard Pass on the N. 90 border route to Courmayeur in Italy.

Details of climb

From Bourg-Saint-Maurice to the south-west, the climb is 15.5 km long. Over this distance, the climb is 799 m. (an average percentage of 5.1%), with the steepest sections at 8.1% at the start of the climb. The descent is by minor roads to join the D902 at Sainte-Foy-Tarentaise.

Appearances in Tour de France

In 2007, Montée d'Hauteville was climbed on stage 8 of the Tour de France.

See also
 List of highest paved roads in Europe
 List of mountain passes

External links
Profile of Little St Bernard Pass on climbbybike.com
Climb profiles 

Mountain passes of Auvergne-Rhône-Alpes
Mountain passes of the Alps
2007 Tour de France